Project Shadowfire was an American police investigation in early 2016 that resulted in the arrest of 1,133 people, 915 of whom are suspected members of "multinational organized criminal gangs", involved in murder, racketeering, drug smuggling and human trafficking from Mexico and elsewhere. The majority of the arrests took place in Los Angeles and San Francisco in California; El Paso and Houston, Texas; Atlanta, Georgia, and San Juan, Puerto Rico. 70,000 US, 150 firearms and more than 20 kg narcotics were seized.

Of the 1133 arrested, 1001 were charged with criminal offenses, and 132 were arrested for immigration violations. Over 900 of those arrested are believed to be members or associates of MS-13, Sureños, Norteños, Bloods and other prison gangs. U.S. Immigration and Customs Enforcement (ICE) officials confirmed that most of those arrested are American citizens, though 239 are foreign nationals from Central America, the Caribbean, Asia and Europe.

Response 
According to Peter Edge of Homeland Security Investigations in an interview with ABC News, Gangs in the US became more significant than ever before, in the statement: "What we are seeing is that the gangs are becoming a little bit more organized as gang members enter the United States, whether it’s legally or illegally, and they're doing a wide variety of recruiting... Our hope [is] that these criminal gang members will be processed through the judicial system, and that we will be ultimately able to deport those who are not citizens of this country."

Former ICE Director Sarah Saldaña released the following statement concerning Project Shadowfire: "This operation is the latest example of ICE's ongoing efforts, begun more than a decade ago under Operation Community Shield, to target violent gang members and their associates, to eradicate the violence they inflict upon our communities and to stop the cash flow to transnational organized crime groups operating overseas."

See also 
 Illegal immigration to the United States
 Mexican Drug War
 Operation Community Shield

References 

2016 in the United States
Illegal immigration to the United States
Battles of the Mexican drug war
Operations against organized crime in the United States